Oxynoemacheilus hazarensis is a species of stone loach which is endemic to Lake Hazar in Turkey and which was described in 2017. Lake Hazar is one of the sources of the Tigris, if  O. hazarensis is confirmed to be endemic to Lake Hazar it will be third fish species endemic to that lake, the others being the cyprinodontid Aphanius asquamatus and the cyprinid Alburnus heckeli''.

References

hazarensis
Taxa named by Jörg Freyhof
Taxa named by Müfit Özuluǧ
Endemic fauna of Turkey
Fish described in 2017